Al Khazaiah or Al-Ghazalah is one of the governorates in Ha'il Region, Saudi Arabia.

References 

Populated places in Ha'il Province
Governorates of Saudi Arabia